Harris County is a county located in the U.S. state of Texas; as of the 2020 census, the population was 4,731,145, making it the most populous county in Texas and the third most populous county in the United States. Its county seat is Houston, the largest city in Texas and fourth largest city in the United States. The county was founded in 1836 and organized in 1837. It is named for John Richardson Harris, who founded the town of Harrisburg on Buffalo Bayou in 1826. According to the July 2021 census estimate, Harris County's population has shifted to 4,728,030 comprising over 16% of Texas's population. Harris County is included in the nine-county Houston–The Woodlands–Sugar Land metropolitan statistical area, which is the fifth-most populous metropolitan area in the United States.

History 

Human remains date habitation to about 4000 BC. Other evidence of humans in the area dates from about 1400 BC, 1 AD, and later in the first millennium. The region became uninhabited from 1 AD to European contact. Little European activity predates 1821. Álvar Núñez Cabeza de Vaca may have visited the area in 1529. French traders recorded passing through in the 18th century. Spaniards attempted to establish a fort in the area around the same time, but did not persist for long.

The first recorded European settlers in Harris County arrived in 1822. Their schooner sailed into Galveston Bay and ran aground on the Red Fish Bar. Some of those passengers traveled further up the bay system, but it is not known whether they settled up Buffalo Bayou or the San Jacinto River. One of these passengers, a Mr. Ryder, settled at what is now known as Morgan's Point, Texas. Also in 1822, John Iiams settled his family at Cedar Point after sailing from Berwick's Bay, Louisiana. Dr. Johnson Hunter arrived just after Iiams. He also wrecked his boat near Galveston. He settled at Morgan's Point and was a grantee of land there. Nathaniel Lynch settled in the area and operated a ferry.

In 1824, the land empresario, Stephen F. Austin convened at the house of William Scott for the purpose of conveying titles for Mexican headrights. He was joined by the land commissioner, Baron von Bastrop, and Austin's secretary, Samuel May Williams. About thirty families gained legal titles to land in what would later be known as Harris County. A few immigrants settled on Buffalo Bayou in these early years, including Moses Callahan, Ezekial Thomas, and the Vince brothers.

Nicolas Clopper arrived in the Galveston Bay area from Ohio in the 1820s. He attempted to develop Buffalo Bayou as a trading conduit for the Brazos River valley. He acquired land at Morgan's Point in 1826.
John Richardson Harris (1790–1829), for whom the county was later named, arrived in 1824. Harris had moved his family to Sainte Genevieve, Missouri Territory, where they had been residing until the early 1820s.

Harris was granted a league of land (about 4,428 acres) at Buffalo Bayou. He platted the town of Harrisburg in 1826, while he established a trading post and a grist mill there. He ran boats transporting goods between New Orleans and Harrisburg until his death in the fall of 1829.

The First Congress of the Republic of Texas established Harrisburg County on December 22, 1836. The original county boundaries included Galveston Island, but were redrawn to its current configuration in May 1838.

The area has had a number of severe weather events, such as the following hurricanes and tropical storms:

 1900 Galveston
 1943 Surprise Hurricane (1943)
 Carla (1961)
 Alicia (1983)
 Rita (2005)
 Ike (2008)
 Harvey (2017)
 Nicholas (2021)
 Allison (2001)
 Erin (2007)
 Imelda (2019)
 Beta (2020)

Geography 
Both its total area and land area are larger than the U.S. state of Rhode Island.

Adjacent counties
 Montgomery (north)
 Liberty (northeast)
 Chambers (east)
 Galveston (southeast)
 Brazoria (south)
 Fort Bend (southwest)
 Waller (northwest)

Communities

Cities

Multiple counties 
 Baytown (partly in Chambers County)
 Friendswood (mostly in Galveston County)
 Houston (county seat and largest municipality) (small parts in Fort Bend and Montgomery counties)
 Katy (partly in Fort Bend and Waller counties)
 League City (mostly in Galveston County)
 Missouri City (mostly in Fort Bend County)
 Pearland (mostly in Brazoria County and a small part in Fort Bend County)
 Seabrook (some water surface in Chambers County)
 Stafford (mostly in Fort Bend County)
 Waller (partly in Waller County)

Harris County only 

 Bellaire
 Bunker Hill Village
 Deer Park
 El Lago
 Galena Park
 Hedwig Village
 Hilshire Village
 Humble
 Hunters Creek Village
 Jacinto City
 Jersey Village
 La Porte
 Morgan's Point
 Nassau Bay
 Pasadena
 Piney Point Village
 Shoreacres
 South Houston
 Southside Place
 Spring Valley Village
 Taylor Lake Village
 Tomball
 Webster
 West University Place

Unincorporated areas

Census-designated places 

 Aldine
 Atascocita
 Barrett
 Channelview
 Cinco Ranch (mostly in Fort Bend County)
 Cloverleaf
 Crosby
 Highlands
 Mission Bend (mostly in Fort Bend County)
 Sheldon
 Spring
 The Woodlands (mostly in Montgomery County)

Unincorporated communities 

 Alief (Partially annexed by Houston, partially unincorporated)
 Airline
 Bammel
 Barker
 Beaumont Place
 Bridgeland
 Cedar Bayou
 Champions Forest
 Cimarron
 Coady
 Cypress
 Dyersdale
 East Aldine
 Fall Creek
 Hockley
 Houmont Park
 Huffman
 Hufsmith
 Kinwood
 Klein
 Kleinbrook
 Kohrville
 Louetta
 Lynchburg
 McNair
 North Houston
 Northcliffe
 Northcliffe Manor
 Northgate Forest
 Remington Ranch
 Rose Hill
 Satsuma
 Traces
 Westfield

Demographics 

Note: the U.S. Census Bureau treats Hispanic/Latino as an ethnic category. This table excludes Latinos from the racial categories and assigns them to a separate category. Hispanics/Latinos can be of any race.

According to the 2000 U.S. census, 3,400,578 people, 1,205,516 households, and 834,217 families resided in the county; in 2010, the population increased to 4,092,459; by the 2020 U.S. census, Harris County had a population of 4,731,145. Overall, Harris County's population has recorded positive growth since the 1850 U.S. census tabulated-population of 4,668.

Among the county population, once predominantly non-Hispanic white, the largest racial or ethnic group has become Hispanic or Latino Americans (43.01%) as of 2020. Following, non-Hispanic whites declined to 27.68% of the population; Black or African Americans were 18.72% of the area population, and Asian Americans made up 7.29% of the county; multiracial Americans increased to 2.57%, American Indians and Alaska Natives declined to 0.18%, and Pacific Islanders grew to 0.07% of the population. Having a large and growing Asian American community alongside Hispanics and Latinos and Black and African American, the Houston Area Asian Survey of the Kinder Institute of Urban Research Houston Area Survey stated that between 1990 and 2000, the Asian population in Harris County increased by 76%; between 2000 and 2010, it increased by 45%.

Economically, Harris County along with other Texas counties has one of the nation's highest property tax rates. In 2007, the county was ranked in the top 25 at 22nd in the nation for property taxes as percentage of the homes value on owner-occupied housing; the list only includes counties with a population over 65,000 for comparability. Additionally, Harris County residents had a median household income of $63,022 with a mean income of $93,184. Families had a median income of $73,274 and mean of $105,534; married-couple families $93,961 with a mean of $128,211; and non-family households a median of $43,488 and mean of $62,435.

With a poverty rate of 15.6% as of 2020, Children At Risk—a local nonprofit research organization—estimated 21% of the Harris County children lived in poverty, 6.5 per 1,000 die before age one, and 38% drop out of high school as of 2007.

Language
In 2000, 1,961,993 residents of Harris County spoke English only. The five largest foreign languages in the county were Spanish or Spanish Creole (1,106,883 speakers), Vietnamese (53,311 speakers), Chinese (33,003 speakers), French including Louisiana French and Patois (33,003 speakers), and Urdu (14,595 speakers). Among those who spoke other languages, 46% of Spanish speakers, 37% of Vietnamese speakers, 50% of Chinese speakers, 85% of French speakers, and 72% of Urdu speakers said that they spoke English at least "very well". By 2020, 55.6% of the county aged 5 and older spoke English only, and 44.4% spoke another language instead of English; Spanish remained the second-most spoken language (35%).

Religion

In 2010 statistics, the largest religious group in Harris County was the Roman Catholic Archdiocese of Galveston–Houston, with 1,947,223 Catholics worshiping at 109 parishes, followed by 579,759 Southern Baptists with 811 congregations, 348,461 non-denominational Christian adherents with 577 congregations, 182,624 United Methodists with 124 congregations, an estimated 117,148 Muslims with 47 congregations, 44,472 LDS Mormons with 77 congregations, 39,041 Episcopalians with 43 congregations, 34,957 PC-USA Presbyterians with 49 congregations, 33,525 Churches of Christ Christians with 124 congregations, and 30,521 LCMS Lutherans with 46 congregations. Altogether, 58.4% of the population was claimed as members by religious congregations, although members of historically African-American denominations were underrepresented due to incomplete information. In 2014, the county had 1,607 religious organizations, the third most out of all U.S. counties.

Government and politics 
County governments serve as agents of the state, with responsibilities defined in the Texas Constitution. Counties are governed by the commissioners' court. Each Texas county has four precinct commissioners and a county judge. Although this body is called a court, it conducts the general business of the county and oversees financial matters. The commissioners court may hire personnel to run major departments, such as health and human services.

Besides the county judge and commissioners, the other elective offices found in most counties include the county attorney, county and district clerks, county treasurer, sheriff, tax assessor-collector, justices of the peace, and constables. As a part of the checks and balances system, counties have an auditor appointed by the district courts.

Harris County was one of the earliest areas of Texas to turn Republican. It voted Republican in all but one presidential election from 1952 to 2004, the lone break coming when native Texan Lyndon Johnson carried it in his 44-state landslide in 1964. In 2008, Barack Obama was the first Democrat to win the county since Texas native Lyndon Johnson in 1964. The urban core of Houston is safely Democratic, while suburban areas such as Cypress, Spring, and Katy in the county's western and northern areas, tend to be strongly Republican. In 2016, Hillary Clinton won the county by the largest margin for a Democrat since 1964. The Democratic Party performed very strongly in the county during the 2018 elections, as it did nationwide. In 2020, Joe Biden improved Clinton's performance by two points while Donald Trump only increased his vote share by one point.  Regardless of the shift towards Democrats and being the most populated county in Texas, for the past 4 elections that it voted for a Democrat, it has always voted to the right of Dallas, Travis, Bexar, and El Paso, each of which have a smaller population.

In 2013, Allen Turner of the Houston Chronicle said that residents of Harris County were "consistently conservative in elections" and that they were, according to a Rice University Kinder Institute for Urban Research opinion poll, "surprisingly liberal on topics such as immigration, gun control and equal matrimonial rights for same-sex couples". Harris is regarded as a moderate or swing county in Texas, and has been a bellwether in presidential elections, voting for winners of every presidential election from 2000 through 2012 (both Barack Obama and Texas resident George W. Bush won the county twice).

As a result of the Obama sweep in 2008, many Democratic candidates in contests for lower-level offices also benefited, and many Republican incumbents were replaced by Democrats in the Harris County courthouse. Some of the defeated Republican district court judges were later re-appointed to vacant District Court benches by Governor Rick Perry. In 2018, Democrats swept the court capturing all 59 seats on the civil, criminal, family, juvenile and probate courts.

The Kinder Institute's Houston Survey in 2018 found that from 2014 through 2018 the number of Houston residents who supported adoption of children by same-sex couples climbed above 50% and remained there, while in 2017 over 56% of residents reported gay or lesbian persons among their circle of close personal friends. A 2013 opinion poll had found that 46% of Harris County residents supported same-sex marriage, up from 37% in 2001. Just above 82% favored offering illegal immigrants a path to citizenship provided they speak English and have no criminal record, holding from 83% in 2013, which was up from 19% in 2009.  In 2013, 87% supported background checks for all firearms, the latest year that question was included in the Kinder Houston Survey. This measure has moved up steadily from 60% in 1985 to 69% in 2000.

County facilities 
The 1910 county courthouse was renovated in the 1950s to update its systems. Some residents, such as Martin Dreyer, a Houston Chronicle reporter, were disturbed by modernization of the building, saying its character had been ruined. In the 21st century, the facility received another major renovation. Completed in 2011, the $50 million, eight-year project was designed to restore notable historic aspects of the courthouse while providing for contemporary communication and building needs.

The Texas First Court of Appeals and the Texas Fourteenth Court of Appeals, since September 3, 2010, are located in the 1910 Harris County courthouse. Previously they were located on the campus of the South Texas College of Law.

The Harris County Jail Complex of the Harris County Sheriff's Office (HCSO) is the largest in Texas, and one of the largest in the nation. In July, 2012, the facility held 9,113 prisoners. To handle overcrowding in the facility, the county had to ship inmates to other counties and some are housed out of the state.

United States Congress

Texas Legislature

Texas Senate

Texas House of Representatives

County government

Harris County elected officials

County services 
The Harris County Flood Control District manages the effects of flooding in the county.

The Harris County Sheriff's Office operates jail facilities and is the primary provider of law enforcement services to the unincorporated areas of the county. The sheriff is the conservator of the peace in the county. The Harris County jail facilities are in northern downtown on the north side of the Buffalo Bayou. The 1200 Jail, the 1307 Jail, (originally a TDCJ facility, leased by the county), and the 701 Jail (formed from existing warehouse storage space) are on the same site.

The Community Services Department provides community services. The department maintains the  Oates Road Cemetery (also known as the Harris County Cemetery) for indigents in eastern Houston, near the former Southern Bible College. In March 2010, the county adopted a cremation first policy, meaning that the default preference for most indigents is to have them cremated instead of buried.

The Harris County Housing Authority (HCHA) is a governmental nonprofit corporation which addresses the need for quality affordable housing. The HCHA has been recognized by the U.S. Department of Housing and Urban Development as the highest performing housing authority in the region and was named one of America's 10 best Public Housing Authorities. Guy R. Rankin, IV is chief executive officer of Harris County Housing Authority (HCHA).

State government 
The Texas Department of Criminal Justice operates some correctional facilities in Harris County, including:
 Kegans Unit, located in Downtown Houston, is a state jail for men. It is in the north of downtown along the north side of the Buffalo Bayou, next to the county facilities.
 Pam Lychner Unit, named after Pam Lychner and located in unincorporated northeast Harris County, east of the city of Humble, is a state jail for men.

As of 2001, Kegans and Lychner serves male state jail offenders from Harris County, with Kegans getting lower-risk offenders and Lychner getting higher-risk and special-needs offenders. If both of the male state jails in Harris County are full, excess offenders go to the Gist Unit in Jefferson County. Female state jail offenders from Harris County go to the Plane Unit in Liberty County.

The South Texas Intermediate Sanction Facility Unit, a parole confinement facility for males operated by Global Expertise in Outsourcing, is in downtown Houston, west of Minute Maid Park.

Law enforcement

 there are over 60 law enforcement agencies operating in the county. They include: the Harris County Sheriff's Office, the Harris County Constable Office, the Houston Police Department, METRO Police Department, other municipal police departments, and school district police departments.

The combined yearly sum spent by these agencies circa 2018 was $1.6 billion. That year the Rice University Kinder Institute for Urban Research released a report advocating for consolidating several of these agencies as a way of saving taxpayer money.

Administration by judiciary
The chief administrative officer of a Texas County, as set up in the Texas Constitution, is the County Judge, who sits as the chair of the county's Commissioners' Court (the equivalent of a Board of Supervisors in some other states). In 2019, Judge Lina Hidalgo was sworn in as the County Judge. The county is split into 4 geographical divisions called precincts. Each precinct elects a Commissioner to represent them on the commissioners court and oversee county government functions in the precinct.

Other elected positions in Harris County include a County Attorney, a County Clerk, a District Attorney, a District Clerk, a Sheriff, 8 Constables, a Tax Assessor-Collector, a County Treasurer, and every judge in the county except municipal judges, who are appointed by the mayors and confirmed by city councils of their respective cities.

Many of the organs of the Harris County government reside in the Harris County Campus in Downtown Houston.

Economy

In 2000, the largest employers in Harris County were Administaff, Compaq, Continental Airlines, Memorial Hermann Healthcare System, and Southwestern Bell.

The University of Houston System's annual impact on the Houston-area's economy as of 2011 equates to that of a major corporation: $1.1 billion in new funds attracted annually to the Houston area, $3.13 billion in total economic benefit, and 24,000 local jobs generated. This is in addition to the over 12,500 new graduates the UH System produces every year who enter the workforce in Houston and throughout Texas. These degree-holders tend to stay in Houston; after five years, 80.5% of graduates are still living and working in the region.

In 2009, 20% of the office space in northwest Harris County was vacant. As of that year, more office space was being built; in 2010, northwest Harris will have twice the amount of office space that it had in 2009. The vacancy rate in the area near Farm to Market Road 1960 and Texas State Highway 249 in north Harris County was 53% in 2009.

Various companies are headquartered in incorporated and unincorporated areas throughout Harris County.

Academy Sports and Outdoors, a sporting goods retailer, has its corporate offices and product distribution center in unincorporated western Harris County. Hewlett-Packard formerly operated its United States region office in a complex northwest unincorporated Harris County; the complex formerly belonged to Compaq prior to Compaq's merger with HP. The HP offices, which are now occupied by Hewlett Packard Enterprise, are now in a limited purpose annexation in Houston. Smith International has its headquarters in the Greenspoint district and in an unincorporated area in Harris County. BJ Services Company has its headquarters in the Spring Branch district and in unincorporated Harris County.  Cybersoft Technologies has its headquarters in an unincorporated area. In 2012, Noble Energy announced that it was consolidating its headquarters and two other Greater Houston offices into a 10-story building on the former Compaq headquarters property in unincorporated Harris County. In 2022, ExxonMobil announced it was moving its headquarters to Harris County from Irving, Texas. Goya Foods previously had its Texas offices in an unincorporated area in the county.

General Electric operates an aeroderivative division facility on Jacintoport in unincorporated Harris County. Randall's Food Markets, a subsidiary of Safeway Inc., has its distribution center in unincorporated Harris County.

In 2008, KBR announced that it will open a new office facility in an unincorporated area in western Harris County. In December KBR said that it would not continue with the plans due to a weakened economy. In January 2009 KBR announced that it will not open the new office facility.

Education

Primary and secondary schools 

The Harris County Department of Education, a county division overseeing education by local school districts, with a 2011 budget around $100 million, is headquartered in the Ronald W. Reagan Building in the Northside district in Houston. It has an Adult Education Center in the Northside and an office in the North Post Oak Building in Spring Branch.

Several school districts serve Harris County communities. Among the 26 districts are:

On July 1, 2013, the North Forest Independent School District closed and its territory became a part of Houston ISD.

In addition, state-operated charter schools are in the county. Charter schools in unincorporated areas include:
 Jamie's House Charter School (6–12)
 Richard Milburn Academy Houston (high school) – Of Milburn Schools
 YES Prep North Central of YES Prep Public Schools

The department of education of the county operates the Highpoint Schools.

Colleges and universities

Four separate and distinct state universities are located in Harris County. The University of Houston is a nationally recognized Tier One research university, and is the flagship institution of the University of Houston System. The  university in Texas, the University of Houston counted 43,774 (fall 2016) students on its 667-acre campus in southeast Houston. The University of Houston–Clear Lake and the University of Houston–Downtown are  universities; they are not branch campuses of the University of Houston. Located in the historic community of Third Ward is Texas Southern University, one of the largest historically black colleges and universities in the United States.

Several private institutions of higher learning—ranging from liberal arts colleges to a nationally recognized research university—are located within Harris County. Rice University is one of the leading teaching and research universities of the United States and ranked the nation's 17th best overall university by U.S. News & World Report.

Four community college districts exist with campuses in and around Harris County:
 The Houston Community College System serves Houston ISD (including the former North Forest ISD), Katy ISD, Spring Branch ISD, Alief ISD, and Stafford MSD. This includes most of the City of Houston.
 The Lone Star College System (formerly North-Harris Montgomery Community College District) serves Aldine ISD, Cypress-Fairbanks ISD, Tomball ISD, Humble ISD, and Klein ISD.  This constitutes the northwestern through northeastern parts of the county.
 San Jacinto College serves Pasadena ISD, Galena Park ISD, Sheldon ISD, Channelview ISD, Deer Park ISD, La Porte ISD, and the Harris County part of Clear Creek ISD. This constitutes southeastern and eastern portions of the county 
 Lee College serves Goose Creek ISD, Crosby ISD, and Huffman ISD, far east to northeast sections
The legislation does not specify which community college is for the Harris County portion of Waller ISD.

The Houston Community College and Lone Star College systems are within the 10 largest institutions of higher learning in the United States.

Public libraries
Harris County operates its own public library system, the Harris County Public Library.

In addition, Houston has the Houston Public Library, a city-controlled public library system.

The cities of Baytown, Bellaire, Deer Park, and Pasadena have their own city-controlled libraries.

Emergency services

Police services 

Incorporated cities operate their own police departments, though Harris County operates the Harris County Sheriff's Office, which serves unincorporated areas and supplements police forces of incorporated areas.

Harris County also has a constable for each of its eight precincts and hundreds of deputies assigned to each. They mainly serve in a patrol function, established to maintain peace in the county as well as providing security to county buildings such as court houses and district attorney's offices.

Municipal fire/EMS services 
The Harris County Fire Marshal's Office operates an Investigative Branch, an Emergency Response Branch (Hazardous Materials Response) and Prevention Branch (Inspections). The office is headquartered at 2318 Atascocita Road in an unincorporated area. Incorporated cities operate their own fire departments. The city of Houston operates the Houston Fire Department which provides fire and emergency medical coverage to the city of Houston.

Emergency services districts
Areas outside of municipal city limits (and some smaller municipalities) have fire and emergency medical services provided by Emergency Service Districts, distinct governmental units with the ability to levy property and sales taxes. ESD's may provide fire service, EMS service or both (dual services) and the services they provide determine the limits on their adoptable tax rate.

ESD's may provide services directly or may contract with an agency or agencies for services. Additionally, ESD's may overlap one another to ensure both fire and EMS services are provided.

Hospital services 

Within Harris County, hospital services for the indigent and needy are provided by the Harris Health System (Harris County Hospital District), a separate governmental entity. Harris Health System operates two hospitals: LBJ General Hospital and Ben Taub General Hospital, as well as many clinics and the former Quentin Mease Community Hospital.

Additionally, numerous private and public hospitals operate in Harris County, including institutions in Texas Medical Center and throughout the county, for example the Harris County Psychiatric Center

Transportation 

Metropolitan Transit Authority of Harris County, Texas (METRO) serves several areas within Harris County. An agency of the Harris County government, Harris County Transit, serves communities in Harris County that are not served by METRO.

In Harris County, the average one way commute for a person using an automobile was 25 minutes, while the average commute for a person not using an automobile was 44 minutes, a 76% longer duration than the figure for commuters with cars.

Major highways

Mass transit 
Many areas in Harris County are served by Metropolitan Transit Authority of Harris County, Texas (METRO), a public transportation agency headquartered in Downtown Houston.

Some communities outside of METRO's service area, such as Baytown, Texas, and Channelview, Texas, are served by Harris County Transit.

Intercity buses 
Greyhound Bus Lines operates various stations throughout Harris County.

Airports 

Two commercial airports, George Bush Intercontinental Airport and William P. Hobby Airport, are located in Houston and in Harris County. The Houston Airport System defines Harris County as a part of Bush Intercontinental's service region. The city of Houston operates Ellington Field, a general aviation and military airport in Harris County.

General aviation airports for fixed-wing aircraft outside of Houston include:
 Publicly owned
 La Porte Municipal Airport in La Porte
 Baytown Airport in unincorporated east Harris County, north of Baytown
 Privately owned, public use
 West Houston Airport is a general aviation airport located in unincorporated western Harris County, west of the Houston city limits.
 Dan Jones International Airport in unincorporated northwestern Harris County
 Weiser Air Park in unincorporated northern Harris County
 David Wayne Hooks Memorial Airport, a general aviation airport, is located outside of the Tomball city limits in unincorporated northwest Harris County.
 Sack-O-Grande Acroport (also known as Harbican Airport) is located in western unincorporated Harris County.
 Privately owned, private use
 Hoffpauir Airport is located in western unincorporated Harris County.

See also 

 Houston metropolitan area
 List of museums in the Texas Gulf Coast
 National Register of Historic Places listings in Harris County, Texas
 North Channel Sentinel
 Recorded Texas Historic Landmarks in Harris County
 USNS Harris County (T-LST-822)

References

External links

 Harris County government's website
 The Handbook of Texas Online: Harris County
 Account of the early days of Harris County, 1824 – 1838 from Indian Wars and Pioneers of Texas by John Henry Brown, hosted by The Portal to Texas History
 Accepted design illustration of Court House from the University of Houston Digital Library (1920–1924)

 
1837 establishments in the Republic of Texas
Populated places established in 1837
Greater Houston
Majority-minority counties in Texas